Château Duhart-Milon, previously also Château Duhart-Milon-Rothschild, is a winery in the Pauillac appellation of the Bordeaux region of France. The wine produced here was classified as one of ten Quatrièmes Crus Classés (Fourth Growths) in the historic Bordeaux Wine Official Classification of 1855. The Château has  planted with Cabernet Sauvignon, Merlot and Cabernet Franc. The Château produces a second wine under the label Moulin de Duhart. It is managed by Charles Chevallier, general manager at Château Lafite Rothschild.

References

External links 
Château Duhart-Milon site

Bordeaux wine producers
Rothschild family residences